The Teterower See Ferry is a cable ferry providing access to the island of Burgwallinsel in the Teterower See in Mecklenburg-Vorpommern, Germany.

References 

Cable ferries in Germany
Transport in Mecklenburg-Western Pomerania